Tousi may refer to:
Ahmad Tousi, an Iranian football coach 
Maryam Tousi, an Iranian sprinter
Tõusi, a village in Varbla Parish, Pärnu County, Estonia

Iranian-language surnames